Norman Pierce (5 September 1900 – 22 March 1968) was a British actor. He was born in Southport, Lancashire. He died in Helions Bumpstead, Essex, England on 22 March 1968 at the age of 67. He played pub landlords and barmen in a number of different films.

His West End stage roles included Frank Harvey's Brighton Rock and Ronald Millar's Waiting for Gillian.

Selected filmography

 Number, Please (1931, Short) - Inspector
 Gay Old Dog (1935)
 Can You Hear Me, Mother? (1935) - Joe
 This Green Hell (1936) - Willington
 Sweeney Todd: The Demon Barber of Fleet Street (1936) - Mr. Findlay
 The Crimes of Stephen Hawke (1936) - Landlord
 To Catch a Thief (1936) - (uncredited)
 Everything Is Thunder (1936) - Hans
 Busman's Holiday (1937) - Crook
 Brief Ecstasy (1937) - Landlord
 The Ticket of Leave Man (1937) - Maltby
 Second Best Bed (1938) - Torceston Magistrate (uncredited)
 Special Edition (1938) - Aiken
 The Return of the Frog (1938) - Policeman (uncredited)
 Sexton Blake and the Hooded Terror (1938) - Inspector Bramley
 The Four Feathers (1939) - Sergeant Brown
 Flying Fifty-Five (1939) - Keats
 Poison Pen (1939) - Village Policeman (uncredited)
 The Thief of Bagdad (1940) - Minor Role (uncredited)
 Saloon Bar (1940) - Bill Hoskins
 South American George (1941) - (uncredited)
 Front Line Kids (1942) - P.C. Rozzer
 Uncensored (1942) - (uncredited)
 In Which We Serve (1942) - Mr Satterthwaite
 Went the Day Well? (1942) - Jim Sturry
 The Bells Go Down (1943) - Pa Robbins
 The Life and Death of Colonel Blimp (1943) - Mr Wynne
 Undercover (1943) - Lieut. Franke
 The Saint Meets the Tiger (1943) - Captain (uncredited)
 Champagne Charlie (1944) - Landlord of Elephant & Castle
 Mr. Emmanuel (1944) - Capt. John Cooper
 Great Day (1945) - Policeman
 The Voice Within (1946) - Publican
 I See a Dark Stranger (1946) - Dance MC
 Send for Paul Temple (1946) - Sergeant Morrison
 Frieda (1947) - Crawley
 Blanche Fury (1948) - Coroner
 My Brother's Keeper (1948) - Policeman at Shorebury (uncredited)
 Elizabeth of Ladymead (1948) - (uncredited)
 William Comes to Town (1948) - Police Sergeant
 Badger's Green (1949) - Sam Rogers
 The Twenty Questions Murder Mystery (1950) - Golf Club Barman (uncredited)
 Chance of a Lifetime (1950) - Franklin
 The Magic Box (1951) - Speaker in Connaught Rooms
 The Case of the Missing Scene (1951) - Sam
 Angels One Five (1952) - 'Bonzo'
 Escape Route (1952) - Inspector Hobbs (uncredited)
 When Knighthood Was in Flower (1953) - Innkeeper
 Port of Escape (1956) - Policeman
 It's Great to Be Young (1956) - Publican
 Tread Softly Stranger (1958) - Publican
 The Rough and the Smooth (1959) - Barman
 The Brides of Dracula (1960) - Landlord

References

External links
 

1900 births
Year of death missing
English male film actors
English male television actors
People from Southport
Male actors from Lancashire
20th-century English male actors